Kerstin von der Decken (born 29 November 1968 in Hamburg) is a German Politician and member of the Christian Democratic Union (CDU).

Career 
Between 1988 and 1994, von der Decken studied Law and International Relations at the University of Bonn and Trier. 

She then worked as a Professor of International Law, European Law, foreign Public Law and Comparative Law at the University of St. Gallen. She became Dean of the St. Gallen Faculty of Law in 2009.

In 2011, von der Decken went to Kiel to teach Public law at the Christian-Albrechts-University in Kiel. In 2016, she became Dean of the Faculty of Law in Kiel. She held both offices until 2018.

On 29 June 2022, she joined the Second Günther Cabinet as Schleswig-Holstein Minister of Justice and Health.

References 

Ministers of the Schleswig-Holstein State Government

21st-century German women politicians

People from Hamburg

Living people

1968 births